Rod Spittle (born 18 July 1955) is a Canadian professional golfer.

Spittle was born in St. Catharines, Ontario. He played college golf at Ohio State University where his teammates included John Cook and Joey Sindelar. He won the Canadian Amateur in 1977 and 1978. After graduating in 1978, with a degree in Business Administration, he did not turn professional in golf, instead choosing to sell insurance, which he did for 25 years. He moved to Ohio, and played amateur golf at a high standard during this period.

Spittle turned professional in 2004, shortly before turning 50. He began playing on the Champions Tour in 2005. His best finish in his first four years was a T-2 at the 2007 Greater Hickory Classic at Rock Barn. He did not play the Champions Tour at all in 2009. In 2010, he Monday-qualified into the AT&T Championship, and won the event in a one-hole sudden-death playoff over Jeff Sluman.

In 2019, Spittle was inducted into the Canadian Golf Hall of Fame.

Amateur wins
1977 Canadian Amateur
1978 Canadian Amateur
2000 Ohio Mid-Amateur
2001 Ohio Mid-Amateur
2003 Ohio Mid-Amateur

Professional wins (1)

Champions Tour wins (1)

Champions Tour playoff record (1–0)

References

External links

Canadian male golfers
Ohio State Buckeyes men's golfers
PGA Tour Champions golfers
Golfing people from Ontario
Sportspeople from St. Catharines
1955 births
Living people